Hueytown High School is a four-year public high school in the Birmingham, Alabama suburb of Hueytown. It is one of fourteen high schools in the Jefferson County School System. Hueytown competes in AHSAA Class 6A athletics.  According to the website "Niche.com" Hueytown High was ranked #48 among the "Top fifty Alabama High Schools for Athletes" in 2020, one of only two Jefferson County School System schools to be so recognized among the state's more than 347 high schools.

Student profile 
Enrollment in grades 9-12 for the 2013-14 school year is 1,113 students. Approximately 51% are white, 43% are African-American, 4% are Hispanic, and 2% are multiracial. Roughly 52% of students qualify for free or reduced price lunch.

Hueytown has a graduation rate of 88%. Approximately 89% of its students meet or exceed state proficiency standards in mathematics, and 85% meet or exceed standards in reading. The average ACT score for Hueytown students is 22.

History 
The first Hueytown High School began classes on February 25, 1921, with students who had transferred from Bessemer High School.  Creation of the high school was long championed by W. R. Copeland, who had for many years been Principal of Hueytown Grammar School and later an Assistant Superintendent of Education for the Jefferson County School System.  Hueytown High would be one of six new high schools (along with Powderly, Jones Valley, West Jefferson, Warrior, and Mortimer Jordan) in the Jefferson County system around that time.  Minor High School followed in 1922.  That first Hueytown High School had an enrollment of just 66 students with 25 seniors in the first graduating class that followed in 1922.  Mr. Harley F. Gilmore was named the first principal and athletic director by the school board on May 6, 1920, nine months before the first classes began.  He was paid an initial annual salary of 2,400 dollars. He would serve as principal from 1920 until his retirement in 1956. His thirty-six year tenure as principal is the longest in school history.  He was commonly referred to as "Professor Gilmore" and the school's original football stadium (built in 1933) was named in his honor.  Prior to his being named Principal, he had been the Superintendent of the Athens City School System.  Only six teachers served on the original staff with Mr. Gilmore.

Subjects available in those early years included French, Latin, chemistry, mathematics, and history.  Home economics was offered for girls and manual arts (woodworking) for the boys.

In 1957, enrollment had reached 1,273.  From 1921 through 1958, the school operated with grades 9-12.  The next year when the school relocated to its Dabbs Avenue campus, it served only grades 10-12.  The old building then became Pittman Junior High School (serving grades 7-9) and continued in that capacity until May 1970.  The school continued to be only Sophomore through Senior classes until the fall of 1991 when the Freshmen class (9th grade) was transferred from Pittman Jr. High School and the school has remained four grades since.

(1) Only three Hueytown High School graduates to become the principal of the school.
Asterisk (*) denotes the individual is deceased.

Campus 

There have been three different campuses for Hueytown High School over the school's existence.  Each one has been located at a different site within the community.

The first campus initially was just a single building.  It was a white-stucco covered brick and wood structure located on the southeast corner of present-day Allison-Bonnett Drive and High School Road. It was designed by David O. Whilldin who was chosen as the architect on March 11, 1920.  The construction contract for the original building was awarded to the low bidder, Miller Brothers at a cost of $43,450. That site adjacent to Gilmore-Vines Stadium is now a city park.  The residence for the school's first principal (Mr. Harley F. Gilmore) was directly across Warrior River Road (now Allison-Bonnett Drive) from the school.  That single story wood frame bungalow style house still stands.  Only the flag pole, a few concrete sidewalk remnants that led to the front entrance, and a historic marker erected by the Hueytown Historical Society on July 19, 2009, note the location of the original school.  The school began to grow rapidly and on November 13, 1921, just nine months after opening, the school Trustees, (D. T. Foust, J. B. Thomas, and S. E. Huey) asked the school board to add two to four new classrooms for the already crowded school.  As the years passed and enrollment continued to grow additional classrooms were added to the main building.  Then two white clapboard-sided four-room annex buildings located on either side of the main building were added.  A fire would destroy the second floor science rooms that were over the front central section of the main building in the late 1930s. An auditorium/gymnasium with a theatrical stage was added about 1940.  The front of this building (which faced High School Road) was attached to the back of the original building.  Its exterior entrance had a portico containing three archways.  It was also painted white with a stucco finish.  The basement of that building contained a kitchen and cafeteria.  Additional classrooms were built under the grandstand of the football stadium.  At least one other wooden building (the boys' shop) was erected sometime prior to 1953.  It stood behind the auditorium.  Today, the football stadium grandstand with its six classrooms and an empty one-story red brick building used for classrooms (built in 1949) and a parking lot between them are all that remain on the site. After the high school (only grades 10-12) was re-located to the new Dabbs Avenue campus, the old school building was renamed W. I. Pittman Junior High School (grades 7-9) in honor of a former member of the Jefferson County School Board.  The original school building served in that capacity for another 14 years until mid-1970 when a new Pittman Jr. High was constructed to replace the seriously decaying original building.  By the late 1960s, the two annex buildings and the boys shop building had been demolished.  During the time that the old building served as Pittman Jr. High it had two principals.  The first was Mr. Dwight M. Riley (1958-1968) who himself had graduated from the first class of Hueytown High in 1922.  He was succeeded as principal at Pittman by Mr. Richard H. Farrar Sr. (1968-1970) who served many more years at the "new" Pittman school.   The entire original school was demolished in 1972, two years after the new Junior High campus was completed on Sunrise Boulevard.

The second campus of Hueytown High was at 131 Dabbs Avenue in Hueytown.   The construction contract for that campus was let on April 26, 1957 and the school opened in the fall of 1958.  It was built to relieve the severe overcrowding of the 1921 school, and its then inadequate and aging facilities.  The second school was an unusual design for the time.  Spread out much like a college campus on a gentle sloping hillside, its architecture was unique among Jefferson County schools.  The school was designed by architect, Charles F. Davis of Van Keuren, Davis & Company of Birmingham.  It featured multiple buildings scattered over several acres on heavily timbered property populated with pine trees, dogwoods, and other hardwoods.  All of the buildings were interconnected by covered walkways over concrete sidewalks.  The 1958 site included four major structures which were all single story.  One was named Main (with administrative offices, band room, choir room, art room, and a gymnasium with a Quonset-style roof).  This building also contained the kitchen, lunchroom and a performance stage that opened into the lunchroom.  The campus also had an all steel and glass library building, and two other academic classroom buildings made of brick with flat roofs. One was named Oak and the other Ivy.  About 1965, a third academic classroom building was added and named Pine which was also designed by Charles F Davis.  It also had two classrooms in a basement level accessed from the back of that building.  In 1976, a second gymnasium with a performance stage was added as well as new band and choir rooms.  The last academic building added to the campus was named Elm (built about 2001) and it was located between Oak and Ivy and constructed of precast concrete block with a metal hip roof.  The campus ceased to serve as the high school when the final class graduated in May 2011.  Like the original school it was now overcrowded and outdated.  The Elm building would later house a DayCare Center and some of the other campus buildings were utilized by Hueytown Alternative School (for adult classes)  The entire campus was eventually abandoned and demolished in October and November 2018, and the property was also cleared of all its trees.   In spring of 2019, site preparation began for a new school that was constructed on the site of the second Hueytown High School.  That new school is named, Hueytown Primary School (grades K-2) and is expected to open in late 2021 or early 2022.  It replaces its predecessor on Forest Road which was Hueytown Elementary School.  Today, the only structure remaining from that second High School located at Dabbs Avenue is the flat-roofed red brick Athletic Field House (built in the late 1960s) and its adjacent parking lot.  Both are located across Forest Road next to the athletic fields which are still in use by the community.

The third and present Hueytown High School began classes on August 15, 2011. Groundbreaking ceremonies were held on October 7, 2009, for this new campus with construction beginning almost immediately. The school was designed by Lathan Associates, and constructed on a  parcel of land costing 1.58 million dollars. It is located off of 15th Street Road. The two-story facility consists of fifty-six classrooms, five science labs, media center, a dining hall for 384, administrative offices, band and choral rooms and a cosmetology lab. Recreational facilities include an auditorium and a 1,650 person competition gym. An additional 6.4 million dollars paid for construction of a new football stadium in which the Gophers played their first game in the fall of 2012. The new stadium replaced the more-than-70-year-old Gilmore-Vines stadium. Gilmore-Vines Stadium saw its final Golden Gopher football game on November 25, 2011. Also new baseball, softball fields, plus two practice fields for use by soccer and the marching band were built at the new school. In recognition of the 1958 campus, the hallways in the new school are named Main, Oak, Ivy, Pine, and Elm after those earlier buildings. Those same halls are adorned with huge collage photo murals featuring images of students, teachers, and school activities from the many years of the school's history.

Extracurricular activity (non-athletic) (past and present) 

Students have participated in extracurricular activities since the very beginning. The first choir at the school was the "Glee Club" organized in 1925 with 45 students.  The first French Club was organized November 1, 1923 with 20 members and the first Spanish Club in 1924 with just eleven members.

Current student groups and activities at Hueytown High School include art club, band, choir, dance team, debate team, DECA, drama club, FBLA, FCCLA, First Priority, color guard, Hueytown Ambassadors, Key Club, majorettes, math team, National Honor Society, Scholar's Bowl, and Science Olympiad.  Other annual events include "The Miss Retrospect Pageant" which has been a part of student activities for many decades as well as the annual High School Senior Prom.  Theater productions have long been a part of the schools' history.  The first known performance recorded in the "Retrospect" mentions a two act comedy play involving 20 students performed on May 2, 1924, entitled "Just Plain Mary," tickets were just 25 and 35 cents.  More recently students performed Rodgers & Hammerstein's great musical, "Oklahoma!" in 2018; Arthur Miller's play about the Salem Witch trials, "The Crucible" also in 2018; and the biblical musical "Joseph and the Amazing Technicolor Dreamcoat" by Andrew Lloyd Webber/Tim Rice (2019) among others.

For many years at both of the first two campuses the students held "Stunt Night", which was initially designed to serve as a major fundraising tool for the school.  The fundraising was chiefly led by the female students and fundraising done within each classroom as well.  The female student who successfully raised the most money was crowned "Miss Hueytown," and some years she was known as "Miss Stunt Night." Following the "pageant" portion each class would perform a theatrical "stunt" or short play written by the students that was independently "judged" as to which class had the best "stunt."  By the early 1970s, the "Miss Hueytown" portion of the event had ceased and the "stunt" performed by each class had become a highly intense (and often overheated rivalry) competition between the "classes" as to who had performed the best "stunt."  It was most often won by the Senior Class.  Stunt Night was discontinued after 1978.

In the 1960s and 1970s, the students "Patriotic Committee" would enter a "float" in the National Veterans Day Parade in Birmingham each November. During one span in the 1970s, Hueytown's students won "The Governor's Trophy" five of six years in a row for the best patriotic float in the parade.

Athletic history 

Today the school's athletic/sports teams, known as the Hueytown Golden Gophers, compete in baseball, basketball, bowling, cheer, cross-country, fishing, football, golf, softball, tennis, track & field, soccer, volleyball and wrestling.

On September 30, 1921, the as yet unnamed "Golden Gophers" played the school's first ever football game by visiting Jefferson County High School (present day Tarrant High).  The next week the team played its first ever home game against Alliance High School and won 9-0.  They would complete that inaugural season with a record of 3-4, including a loss to the Howard College Grass Cutters (Now Samford University).  Their "head coach" that first year was the school Principal, Mr. Gilmore who was the only male teacher on the staff.

That same season the boys' baseball team posted a 10-3 record.  Hueytown's first girls' basketball was also in 1921 and finished with a record of 4-1.  Since then the girls teams had their best back to back seasons in 2000-01 and 2001-02 when they were Area Champs both seasons and posted a record of 49-13.

During the next six years after that inaugural football season the team would post a record of 28-16-5, including the 1924 team (7-1-1) which outscored opponents by the margin of 256-38.  The 1924 squad had four shutouts and a victory over St. Bernard College of Cullman.

The Gophers' most successful football period occurred from 1948 to 1962, when Melvin Vines (who played on the 1925 & 1926 University of Alabama Rose Bowl teams) coached Gopher teams to an aggregate record of 78-44-9. His most successful team was the 1958 unit (10-0), the first undefeated and untied team in school history. The team recorded eight shutouts and outscored opponents 253-26, and it won the Jefferson County Championship (The Dental Clinic Classic) over Fairfield High School that same year by a score of 7-0. Vines' teams won five county championships at a time when no statewide playoff system existed.  The Gophers won another County Championship in the Dental Clinic Classic in 1967 defeating Minor High School 14-6.

From the beginning of the program through the 2021 season, the Golden Gophers football team has amassed a record of 519-442-32.  This makes the Gophers one of the top five winningest programs among all high schools in Jefferson County history.  While the team has many traditional rivals, there are only four schools whom they have played at least fifty times.  They have most often faced Minor High School with 85 matches on the gridiron.  Hueytown posts a record of 48-34-3 in the series through 2021 with Minor.  The two schools first met in 1923 with the Golden Gophers winning 82-0 in what is still the most lop-sided game in the history of the school.  The second most contests have been the 77 games with Bessemer High School whom Hueytown first played in 1922 initially on an irregular basis.  The first win against Bessemer would come in their ninth meeting in the final game of the season on November 30, 1939.  Hueytown defeated Bessemer with a lone field goal 3-0 under the guidance of Head Coach John Henry Suther.  It was their fifth shutout of the season.  The most recent game against Bessemer in 2021 resulted in a 57-6 Gopher win, the most one-sided Hueytown victory in the history of the series.  The third most common opponent is Shades Valley High School (which prior to 1949 was Shades Cahaba High School).  The Mounties and the Gophers have now played 66 times.  Hueytown leads the combined series 32-31-3.  However, the record when the school was Shades Cahaba was 16-5-1 and since it became Shades Valley the record is 16-26-2.  In 1949, Hueytown defeated Shades Valley in the Dental Clinic Classic, the only game they faced against each other for the Jefferson County Championship with the Gophers winning by a score of 34-14.  The fourth most common rival was Jones Valley High School, which ceased to exist as a high school after the 1988-1989 season.  The two schools first met in 1921, the inaugural season for both schools.  Hueytown won that first game by a score of 61-0.  They would play every year thereafter (except 1965-67) through the 1973 season when they met for the last time with Hueytown victorious 24-6.  Hueytown led the now defunct series 28-19-3.

Since the advent of a state playoff system in 1970, the football team has made several appearances with trips to the playoffs in 1974, 1975, 1995, 2001, 2004, 2006, 2007, 2008, 2010, 2011, 2012, 2016, 2017, 2018, 2019, 2020 and 2021. The football team has also won five Region Titles in 1974, 1975, 2011, 2018 and 2019 and 2021. The 2010 football team was the first team to record 11 wins in a season, a feat repeated again in 2019.  The 2011 squad won all 10 regular-season games and then won three rounds in the state playoff. It finished with a record of 13-1, making it the first team to win 13 games.   That feat was repeated by the 2021 team which went 13-2 and finished second in the state.

The Golden Gophers football team played their inaugural game in their new on-campus stadium on August 30, 2012, defeating Pell City High School 35-34.  They would finish that regular season with a record of 6-4.

Prior to 1970 "mythical" football titles were often awarded to football teams by various newspapers around the state.  In addition, between 1948-1995, there was an annual football game called the "Dental Clinic Classic" that awarded a "Jefferson County Championship" to the winner of its contest.  Hueytown played in that game seven times and won four in 1949, 1951, 1958, and 1967.  They lost the game in 1950, 1953, and 1966.

The Head football Coach beginning in 2019 is Greg Patterson.

Listed below are the head football coaches in school history who had winning records that included at least 10 wins.

In 1974, the Hueytown High wrestling team won the school's first AHSAA Championship with the 4A State Title under the guidance of then head-wrestling coach, George A. "Tony" Morton.

The boys' baseball team has traditionally been among the state's top programs including an AHSAA 4A Championship in 1976.  Hueytown's first ever baseball game was in 1921 with a 9-4 victory over Oak Grove High School.  On February 25, 2021, the 100th Anniversary of the school, the baseball field was named "Rick Patterson Field," after the school's long-time baseball coach who unexpectedly passed away on September 29, 2020.

The girls' softball team has won four AHSAA state championships in six years with titles in 2005, 2006, and 2008 as a 6A school and 2010 as a 5A school.

The boys' basketball team has on six occasions been Area Champs in 1978, 1982, 1984, 1987, 1998, and 2018.

The 1992 Majorettes won the 4A State Championship in twirling.

Over the years some athletic competitive sports/competitions have "come and gone" for a variety of reasons.  No longer does the school field teams as it once did in Archery,  Boxing, and Tumbling (Gymnastics).

The Golden Gopher nickname

Many different stories have been suggested as to how Hueytown's athletic teams acquired the rare nickname that only two other high schools (Ridgemont High of Ohio; Pavilion High of New York) and one university share according to MascotDB.com.  Most often, it is said to be linked somehow to the National Championship football teams of the Minnesota Golden Gophers in 1934, 1935, 1936.  However, this alone cannot be the reason since the Hueytown High yearbook, "The Retrospect" first mentions the football team nickname 11 years earlier in 1923 as the "Gophers.".   The same yearbook also mentions the school colors as "Purple and Gold" and refers to the girls basketball team as "The Gopherettes"  While these references do not eliminate the University of Minnesota as being the inspiration since they have played football with that nickname since 1882, some other rationale must be the answer.   It is also sometimes generally stated that Hueytown's first full-time football coach, Ralph "Fats" Snider was a Minnesota graduate, however, The Retrospect also states that Coach Snider played "center" for Auburn University, so neither is that the inspiration.

Notable alumni

 Davey Allison, (Class of 1979), named as one of NASCAR's 50 Greatest Drivers. 1987 NASCAR Winston Cup Series Rookie of the Year. Winner of Daytona 500, Coca-Cola 600, Winston 500 and numerous other major races. Alabama Sports Hall of Fame (1995); NASCAR Hall of Fame (2019)
 R. G. Armstrong, (Class of 1935), movie and television character actor (often featured in Westerns) with a career spanning over 40 years.
 Delor Baumann, (Class of 1971); Mayor of Hueytown, Al (2004-2016)
 Jerry Brasseale (Class of 1966), Mayor of Pleasant Grove, Al (1996–present) elected six times.
 Jeremy Brown, (Class of 1998), played college baseball at the University of Alabama; former major League Baseball player, Oakland Athletics (2006).
 Jared L. Bradford, (Class of 2004), Professional Baseball player. He played for the Louisiana State University Tigers in college, and in the St. Louis Cardinals organization (2008-2011).
 Walter G. Bridges Sr., (Class of 1940), long-time district and circuit judge, Bessemer Division, World War II veteran and POW.
 Lewis Brooks, (Class of 1984), Superintendent of Shelby County (Alabama) School System (January, 2019–present)
 Kelley Castlin-Galutan, Superintendent of Birmingham School System (2015-2016)
 John Thurman "Red" Cochran Jr., (Class of 1940?), National Football League player, Chicago Cardinals (1947-1950); long-time National Football League Assistant Coach (1956-1974) with Packers, Lions, Cardinals, and Chargers; Alabama Sports Hall of Fame (2014); Green Bay Packers Hall of Fame (1997).
 Daniel Alford "Al" Crowson, (Class of 1963), Circuit Judge-18th Judicial Circuit of Alabama(1988-2005)
 Johnny Curry, (Class of 1975), Member, Alabama House of Representatives (1986-2002)., Chairman-Jefferson County Republican Party (1991-1995).
 Russ Davis, (Class of 1987), Major League Baseball player (1994–2001) where he played 569 games.(New York Yankees, Seattle Mariners, San Francisco Giants).
 Rhonda Dotson, (Class of 1976), movie and television actress, appeared in films, 'City of Angels' (1998), 'The Negotiator' (1998) and television series, 'Hell Town' (1985)
 Tom Egan, (Class of 1969), co-sysop of America On-Line; Nuclear Engineer with General Electric.
 Frank House, (Class of 1949), former Major League Baseball player for 10 years (played 653 games) (Detroit Tigers, Kansas City Athletics, Cincinnati Reds), Member, Alabama House of Representatives (1966-1970); Alabama Sports Hall of Fame (1975).
 Roger D. Halcomb, (Class of 1963) Circuit and District Judge-10th Judicial Circuit
 Tom Hardy, (Class of 1964), former corporate head of the IBM Design Program instrumental in development of the original IBM Personal Computer (1981) and the first IBM ThinkPad (1992).
 Robert Higginbotham, (Class of 1965), Alabama high school football coach (1973–2008), Record 273-129-3 with one state football championship. Inducted Alabama High School Sports Hall of Fame, 2002.
 Morris Lee Jackson, (Class of 1957), successful businessman, owner of multiple "Chic-Fil-A" restaurants.
 Joseph Edwin Johnson, (Class of 1951), President, University of Tennessee 1990-1999; current President Emeritus of UT
 Judson L. Jones, (Class of 1964); long-time public school administrator and the third graduate of the school to later become its Principal.
 Emmit King, (Class of 1978); NCAA 1983 National Champion Sprinter, Track & Field, 100 Meters; Bronze Medal (1983) World Championships.
 Deon Lacey, (Class of 2008), professional football player, Edmonton Eskimos, Miami Dolphins, Buffalo Bills (2017). In HHS Track & Field, holds school record for 400 meters.
 Greta Lambert, (Class of 1974), professional actress, director, and current Associate Artistic Director of the Alabama Shakespeare Festival. Primary work in theater and Alabama Shakespeare Festival, television appearances in Picket Fences and Young Riders.
 James I. "Spider" Martin, (Class of 1958); prominent news Photographer known for his images covering Martin Luther King Jr. and the civil rights movement.
Wilson Daniel "Dee" Miles, (Class of 1928) played seven years (503 games) in MLB (1935-1943), Washington Senators, Philadelphia A's, Boston Red Sox
 Joseph B. Morton, (Class of 1964), Alabama Superintendent of Education (July 2004 through August 31, 2011)
George M. Murray, (Class of 1936?), prominent theologian and Bishop of the Episcopal Church
 Douglas M. "Mac" Parsons (Class of 1960), Alabama State Senator (1978-1994) and Judge of 10th Judicial Circuit (1999-2011).
 Jennifer (Hatcher) Parsons, (Class of 1975), member, Jefferson County Board of Education (1999-2017).
 Stevan H. Parsons, (Class of 1975), Mayor, Sylvan Springs, Alabama (2004–present); owner of two veterinarian clinics.
 Mary Evelyn (Knight) Roberts, (Class of 1947); founder and first librarian of Hueytown Public Library (1966-1998).
 William L. Roper, (Class of 1966); Assistant to the President of the United States for Health Policy (1983–86); Chief Health Officer, Jefferson County, Alabama (1977–1983); Director, Centers for Disease Control and Prevention (1990–1993); current CEO University of North Carolina Health Systems.Dean of the School of Medicine at University of North Carolina
 Pam Segars-Morris (Class of 1966); prominent local business leader and owner of Real Estate business.
 Richard Shelby, (Class of 1953), United States Senator (1987–present), U.S. House of Representatives (1979-1987), Alabama State Senate (1971-1979).
 Samuel K. Staggs, (Class of 1971); 38 year career in public education including years as Principal, McAdory High School (2001–13) and Principal of North Highlands Elementary School (in Hueytown, AL)
 Leigh Streetman, (Class of 2010), Asst. Softball Coach, Mississippi College Lady Choctaws (2017–present), Miss Softball (2010) by Alabama Sportswriters, Four year starter at UAB (2011–14) holds multiple school records. 
 Karen (Sullivan) Tucker, (Class of 1973), initially appointed Assistant Tax Assessor-Bessemer Division of Jefferson County (1995-2006) by Governor Fob James, and subsequently re-elected.
 Dr. Edwin Glenn Waldrop, (Class of 1941), prominent Birmingham physician, in first graduating class of UAB School of Medicine; President of Univ. of Alabama Medical Alumni Assoc. (1964)
 George M. "Butch" Wilson, (Class of 1959), former National Football League football player who played tight end for seven seasons at the Baltimore Colts and New York Giants.
 Jameis Winston, (Class of 2012), 2013 Heisman Trophy winner, and 2014 BCS National Championship Offensive MVP. Football quarterback and baseball outfielder for the Florida State Seminoles.  NFL first pick to the Tampa Bay Buccaneers.
 Ericka Woode, (Class of 1990), Birmingham Talk Radio personality & News Journalist, Cumulus Radio.

References

External links 
 Hueytown High School

Educational institutions established in 1922
Public high schools in Alabama
Schools in Jefferson County, Alabama
1922 establishments in Alabama